The Night With the Emperor is a 1936 German historical comedy film directed by Erich Engel and starring Jenny Jugo, Richard Romanowsky, and Friedrich Benfer. It was shot at the Johannisthal Studios of Tobis Film in Berlin. The film's sets were designed by the art directors Karl Haacker and Hermann Warm. The film is set in 1808 at the Congress of Erfurt.

Cast

References

Bibliography
 
 Klaus, Ulrich J. Deutsche Tonfilme: Jahrgang 1936. Klaus-Archiv, 1988.

External links 
 

1936 films
1930s historical comedy films
German historical comedy films
Films of Nazi Germany
1930s German-language films
Films directed by Erich Engel
Films set in 1808
Films set in Germany
Depictions of Napoleon on film
German black-and-white films
1930s German films
Films shot at Johannisthal Studios
Tobis Film films